Roopu or Rōpū is a Māori word for an organisation, group, or collective. The term is widely used throughout New Zealand as part of the name of organisations, especially those which have a strong connection with the New Zealand Māori population. In organisational names, it is usually prefixed with the word Te ("The"). Traditionally, the word is spelt roopu, but modern linguistics favours the use of a macron over a single vowel to indicate a longher sound, rather than a double letter. The word is likely to be a Maorified form of the English word "group".

Notable organisations within New Zealand which use Roopu or Rōpū as part of their names include:

Te Roopu Huihuinga Hauora (a major Māori healthcare organisation)
New Zealand Association of Counsellors / Te Roopu Kaiwhiriwhiri o Aotearoa
Te Roopū Māori (the Māori students' association of the University of Otago)
Te Roopu Pounamu (the Māori network of the Green Party of Aotearoa New Zealand)
Te Roopu Raranga Whatu o Aotearoa (the national Māori weavers' collective)
Te Roopu Rawakore (the National Unemployed and Beneficiaries Movement)
New Zealand Law Students' Association Te Roopu Tauira Ture o Aotearoa
Te Rōpū o te Ora / Women's Health League
Te Ropu Wahine Maori Toko i te Ora (Māori Women's Welfare League)
The Waitangi Tribunal/Te Rōpū Whakamana i te Tiriti

Māori words and phrases
Māori culture